Florin Mergea was the defending champion, but did not complete in the Juniors this year.

Gaël Monfils defeated Miles Kasiri in the final, 7–5, 7–6(8-6) to win the boys' singles tennis title at the 2004 Wimbledon Championships.

Seeds

  Gaël Monfils (champion)
  Andy Murray (third round)
  Josselin Ouanna (third round)
  Kamil Čapkovič (third round)
  Alex Kuznetsov (second round)
  Mischa Zverev (second round)
  Brendan Evans (quarterfinals)
  Sebastian Rieschick (third round)
  Pablo Andújar (first round)
  Kim Sun-yong (first round)
  Scoville Jenkins (semifinals)
  Karan Rastogi (first round)
  Fabio Fognini (first round)
  Scott Oudsema (first round)
  Coen van Keulen (first round)
  Remko de Rijke (third round)

Draw

Finals

Top half

Section 1

Section 2

Bottom half

Section 3

Section 4

References

External links

Boys' Singles
Wimbledon Championship by year – Boys' singles